George William Richardson  (born 26 April 1938) is a former English cricketer who played first-class cricket for Derbyshire between 1959 and 1965.

Richardson was born at Marylebone, London, the son of Arthur Walker Richardson, who played for Derbyshire between 1928 and 1936 and was club captain for five of those years, taking the Championship in 1936.

Richardson was educated at Winchester College and started his career at Derbyshire in the 1959 season, taking three wickets in his debut match against Worcestershire, and making his top score of 91 in his next match against Glamorgan. Against Kent, in one match he achieved his best bowling performance of 8 for 54 and in the other almost matched it with 7 for 31. In the 1960 season in a single match against Warwickshire he took 6 for 46 and 5 for 35. From 1961 he played intermittently. He played seven games in the 1961 season, but fifteen in the 1962 season. He played three first-class matches in the 1963 season and one in the 1964 season, as well as the Gillette Cup in both years. In the 1965 season he played one Gillette Cup match and six first-class matches in the course of which he took 5 for 57 against Kent.

Richardson was a right-handed batsman and played 107 innings in 69 first-class matches with an average of 15.86 and a top score of 91. He played three innings in three one-day matches and made 39 runs. He was a left-arm medium-fast bowler and took 147 first-class wickets with an average of 27.70 and a best performance of 8 for 54. He took 8 wickets in the one-day game.

Richardson was the second of three generations of Richardson family members to play cricket. His son Alastair Richardson played in 1992 and 1993.

References

1938 births
English cricketers
Living people
People educated at Winchester College
Derbyshire cricketers
Marylebone Cricket Club cricketers
Gentlemen cricketers